Emonsing M Sangma (born 17 March 1913 in Sandong Songma) was a politician from Indian state of Assam and member of Assam Assembly during 1952–56. He got reelected for the term 1962–1967.

He was elected to Rajya Sabha, from Assam during by-election in 1967 for term till 1970 and for full term of 1970-1976 as INC candidate.

References

1913 births
Members of the Assam Legislative Assembly
Rajya Sabha members from Assam
Year of death missing
Indian National Congress politicians
People from Tura, Meghalaya
Garo people
Indian National Congress politicians from Assam